The Battle of Ismailia of 1952 is an armed clash that took place in the city of Ismailia on January 25, 1952, when the Egyptian police forces refused to surrender their weapons and vacate the governorate building to British forces. The clash between Egyptian police and British forces killed 56 Egyptian policemen and wounded 73, and killed 13 British soldiers and wounded 22. The British forces seized the Ismailia Governorate building. Captain Salah Zulfikar was a major key figure who volunteered in the battle. British forces suffered losses of 33 dead and 69 wounded during fedayeen attacks.

January 25 turned into the National Police Day that is celebrated every year. It also became a national holiday for Ismailia Governorate, and in 2009 January 25 of each year became an official holiday in Egypt.

Background 
Tensions rose between Egypt and Britain when acts of sabotage and commando activities intensified against their camps, soldiers, and officers in the Canal region, as the British losses as a result of commando operations were heavy, especially in the early stages. Extreme embarrassment. And when the government announced the opening of offices to register the names of camp workers wishing to leave their work and contribute to the national struggle, [91572] workers registered their names in the period from October 16, 1951, to November 30, 1951, and contractors also stopped supplying vegetables, meat, and other supplies necessary for the sustenance of 80,000 soldiers.  and a British officer.

The British forces embarked on another adventure no less reckless or provocative than their previous attempts to insult and humiliate the Egyptian government until it reversed its decision to cancel the treaty.
The Egyptian police forces in Ismailia hand over their weapons to the British forces, evacuate the governorate house and the barracks, leave the entire Canal area, and withdraw to Cairo under the pretext that it is the center of disappearance for the Egyptian fighters fighting against his forces in the Canal region.  The province rejected the British ultimatum and reported it to the Minister of the Interior, Fuad Sara al-Din Pasha, who approved its position and asked it to stand firm, resist and not surrender. The British commander in the canal lost his nerve, so his forces, tanks, and armored vehicles attacked the Ismailia police station for the same reason, after he sent an ultimatum to the police station warden asking him to hand over the weapons of his soldiers and soldiers, but the police officers and soldiers refused to accept this warning.

On the morning of Saturday, January 26, 1952, the news of the incident spread throughout Egypt, and the Egyptians received this news with anger and discontent, and massive demonstrations took place in Cairo, and police soldiers participated with university students in their demonstrations, and demonstrations broke out in the streets of Cairo, which were filled with angry masses.

This angry atmosphere caused the Cairo fire, and further caused the deterioration of King Farouk's popularity to the highest level, which paved the way for the officers to launch the July 23 Movement led by Major General Mohamed Naguib in the same year.

Conflict 
The British tanks directed their cannons and fired bombs in a focused and brutal manner non-stop for more than an hour. The police forces were armed with nothing but old regular rifles. Before sunset that day, the small police department building and the governorate building in Ismailia were besieged by seven thousand British soldiers equipped with weapons, supported by their heavy Centurion tanks, armored vehicles, and field guns, while the number of besieged Egyptian soldiers did not exceed eight hundred in the barracks and eighty in the governorate. They don't carry guns.

The British used all their weapons to bomb the governorate building, yet the Egyptian soldiers resisted and continued to resist with great courage and valor. An unequal battle took place between the British forces and the besieged police forces in the section. This massacre did not stop until the last bullet with them ran out after two long hours of fighting. Among them were 52 dead and 80 wounded, all of whom were soldiers and officers of the police force that was stationed in the department building, and about seventy others were wounded, in addition to a number of civilians and the families of the rest of them.

The British also ordered the destruction of some villages around Ismailia, which was believed to be the center of the disappearance of Egyptian fedayeen struggling against his forces, so a number of other civilians were killed or wounded during the British forces' inspections of the villages.

Gallery

References 

Egyptian nationalism
1952 in Egypt
20th-century revolutions
Arab nationalism in Egypt
Cold War conflicts
Cold War in Africa
Conflicts in 1952
Egypt–United Kingdom relations
History of Egypt (1900–present)
Politics of Egypt
Protests in Egypt